Eddy Louiss (2 May 1941 – 30 June 2015) was a French jazz musician.

Eddy started playing in his father Pierre's orchestra in the 1950s. Pierre changed the family name from Louise to Louiss. As a vocalist, he was a member of Les Double Six of Paris from 1961 through 1963. During this time his primary instrument became the Hammond organ.

In 1964, he was awarded the Prix Django Reinhardt.

For 13 years, between 1964 and 1977, he played with leading French musician Claude Nougaro.  After that, he made the decision, one that his son Pierre described as "not that easy", to split from Nougaro to head out on a solo career.

He worked with Kenny Clarke, René Thomas, and Jean-Luc Ponty. In 1971 he was a member of the Stan Getz quartet (with René Thomas and Bernard Lubat) that recorded the Getz album Dynasty (1971).

Eddy Louiss had his left leg amputated in the early 1990s after suffering artery problems, following which he made few public appearances.

In duet, he recorded with pianist Michel Petrucciani (1994) and accordionist Richard Galliano (2002). His later recordings, such as Sentimental Feeling and Récit proche, combined jazz with rock and world music.

Discography
 Jazz Long Playing with Daniel Humair and Jean-Luc Ponty (1964)
 Trio HLP with Daniel Humair and Jean-Luc Ponty (All Life, 1966)
 Eddy Louiss Trio with Kenny Clarke, René Thomas (1968)
 Our Kind of Sabi with John Surman, Niels-Henning Ørsted Pedersen and Daniel Humair, 1970
 Orgue, Vols. 1 & 2, with Kenny Clarke, Jimmy Gourley, Guy Pedersen (America, 1971)
 Bohemia After Dark, with Jimmy Gourley, Guy Pedersen, Kenny Clarke, 1973
 Histoire Sans Parole, 1979
 Sang mêlé, 1987
 Eddy Louiss/Michel Petrucciani (live), 1994
 Conférence de presse with Michel Petrucciani, 1994
 Conférence de presse, Vol. 2, 1995
 Louissiana, 1995
 Floméla with Marc Bertaux, Tony Bonfils, Steve Ferrone, Bob Garcia, Jo Maka, Luigi Trussardi, Jean-Louis Viale, 1996
 Multicolor Feeling Fanfare, 1989
 WéBé, 2000
 Recit Proche with Xavier Cobo, Jean Marie Ecay, Paco Sery, 2001
 Jazz in Paris: Bohemia After Dark with Kenny Clarke, Jimmy Gourley, Guy Pedersen, 2001
 Jazz in Paris: Porgy & Bess 2001
 Face to Face with Richard Galliano, 2001
 Ô Toulouse...Hommage à Claude, 2006

With Stan Getz
 Dynasty (Verve, 1971)
 Communications '72 (Verve, 1972)

References

External links
 

1941 births
2015 deaths
French jazz pianists
French male pianists
French jazz organists
Musicians from Paris
20th-century organists
20th-century French musicians
French male organists
21st-century organists
21st-century French musicians
20th-century French male musicians
21st-century French male musicians
French male jazz musicians
Les Double Six members